More is the third studio album and first soundtrack album by English rock band Pink Floyd. It was released on 13 June 1969 in the United Kingdom by EMI Columbia and on 9 August 1969 in the United States by Tower Records. The soundtrack is for the film of the same name, which was primarily filmed on location on Ibiza and was the directorial debut of Barbet Schroeder. It was the band's first album without former leader Syd Barrett.

The album was a top ten hit in the UK, but received mixed reviews. Several songs became live favourites over the following years.

Background
Pink Floyd recorded several pieces of film music before this album. In December 1967, they were featured on the BBC's Tomorrow's World, playing along to a light show, and the following year recorded some instrumental music for the film The Committee.

The film More featured a young hitchhiker in Ibiza who had succumbed to heroin abuse with party scenes and drug taking. Director Barbet Schroeder was a fan of Pink Floyd, and brought a rough cut of the film to London for them to work with. Instead of typical background music, Schroeder wanted the songs to feature in the film, such as a record playing at a party. The group also speculated they could branch out into a career as film composers if their recording and touring career did not work out. Drummer Nick Mason later said the film was "ideally suited to some of the rumblings, squeaks and sound textures we produced on a regular basis".

Recording and songs
The album was recorded at Pye Studios in London, in late January and early February 1969 with engineer Brian Humphries. The album was the first to be produced by Pink Floyd without assistance from Norman Smith, who retained an executive producer credit, and the first full album without Syd Barrett, who had been ousted from the group in 1968, during the recording of their second album, A Saucerful of Secrets.

Pink Floyd worked out most of the music in two weeks, with material put together quickly and semi-improvised. They did not use a dubbing studio due to budget constraints, and simply timed sequences in the film with a stopwatch so they knew how long the music had to be. Bassist Roger Waters wrote most of the lyrics during breaks between recording backing tracks. Schroeder was impressed by how quickly the group created and recorded the material. Mason and keyboardist Richard Wright co-wrote the instrumental "Up The Khyber", the only time the pair were credited as sole co-composers. Barrett's replacement David Gilmour handled all lead vocals on the album.

More features a mixture of styles. Songs such as "Green is the Colour" were acoustic folk ballads, a genre not often explored by the group. Mason's wife Lindy played penny whistle on the track. The album also contains hard rock, such as "The Nile Song" and "Ibiza Bar", as well as several instrumental tracks such as "Quicksilver" and "Main Theme", featuring their experimental and avant-garde approach. "Cymbaline" criticised the music industry, with lines such as "your manager and agent are both busy on the phone". The version on the album is different from that in the film. Gilmour sings lead on both versions, though Waters is sometimes wrongly credited as singing lead for the film version.

"Green is the Colour" was played live frequently after release, as a medley with "Careful With That Axe, Eugene", as part of a live suite called "The Journey". It was a regular feature in the set for two years afterwards. "Quicksilver" was played under the title "Sleeping" as part of the 1969 live show called "The Man", while "Cymbaline" was entitled "Nightmare". The latter remained part of the group's repertoire until the end of 1971. In live performances, the group left the stage partway through the song while the audience listened to a tape of quadraphonic sound effects including footsteps travelling round the venue, and doors opening. "Main Theme" was briefly played live in 1970.

Two songs can be heard in the film which were not included on the album: "Hollywood" and "Seabirds". The latter was published in 1976's The Pink Floyd Songbook. Both songs, as well as two other songs from those sessions, "Theme (Beat Version)" and "More Blues (Alternative Version)", were released on the 2016 box set, The Early Years 1965–1972. The set in which these tracks appear, 1969: Dramatis/ation was made available as a standalone release in 2017. The track called "Seabirds" in the box set is not the original song, but an alternative take of "Quicksilver".

Tracks like "The Crying Song" and "Cymbaline" play on female lead Mimsy Farmer's transistor radio as she's in her apartment room, and "Ibiza Bar" (as the title implies) plays in the background in a bar. These differ from tracks such as "Up The Khyber" that plays to the action of the film, in which the band are actual composers, or tracks such as "Cirrus Minor" and "Green is the Colour" that play to orchestrate the mood of the scene, and these tracks (and others), unlike "The Crying Song" and "Cymbaline", are not heard by any of the characters.

Cover
The album cover was, like A Saucerful of Secrets, designed by Hipgnosis. It uses a shot from the film of two characters playing around a windmill in Ibiza, processed in a dark room to make it look like a psychedelic trip.

Release and reception

More reached number 9 in the UK and, upon re-release in 1973, number 153 in the US. This was the last of three Pink Floyd albums to be released in the United States by the Tower Records division of Capitol Records. "The Nile Song" was released as a single in France, Japan and New Zealand around the same time. The track, along with "Cirrus Minor" appeared on the 1971 compilation Relics.

A 1973 US reissue was released on Harvest Records. It was certified gold in the US on 11 March 1994. The album was reissued on CD in 1985, with a digitally remastered version following in 1995. In 2016, it was reissued on Pink Floyd Records.

More received mixed reviews from critics. Record Song Book said the album was "always extremely interesting ... quite weird in parts too". The Daily Telegraph was favourable, describing it as starting to "define experimental instrumental identity." MusicHound and Rolling Stone were less positive with the former giving the album a rating of one out of five and the latter calling it a "dull film soundtrack".

Legacy
Richie Unterberger of AllMusic gives a mixed overview, saying key tracks such as "Green Is The Colour" and "Cymbaline" developed into stronger pieces when played live.

Track listing

All lead vocals by David Gilmour.

Personnel
Roger Waters – bass guitar 
Richard Wright – keyboards, vocals
David Gilmour – guitar, vocals
Nick Mason – drums

Additional personnel
Lindy Mason – tin whistle 
Brian Humphries – engineering
Hipgnosis – sleeve design
James Guthrie – re-mastering supervision
Doug Sax – re-mastering

Charts

Certifications

References
Citations

Sources

External links

1969 albums
1969 soundtrack albums
Albums produced by David Gilmour
Albums produced by Nick Mason
Albums produced by Richard Wright (musician)
Albums produced by Roger Waters
Albums with cover art by Hipgnosis
Albums with cover art by Storm Thorgerson
Capitol Records albums
Capitol Records soundtracks
EMI Columbia Records albums
EMI Columbia Records soundtracks
Harvest Records albums
Harvest Records soundtracks
Pink Floyd albums
Pink Floyd soundtracks
Progressive rock soundtracks
Tower Records albums
Tower Records soundtracks
Drama film soundtracks